Gatineau is a Canadian francophone hip hop band from Montreal. The band members are Séba, Capt. Keük, Burne MacPhersound and Dom HameLLL.

History
Gatineau was founded in 2004. By 2005, the group was performing in Quebec. Their self-titled debut album, was released in 2007; it won the 2008 Félix Award for Best Hip Hop Album.  The album was mainly hip hop, but also showed influences of rock, jazz and pop. Also in 2008 the group toured in France and performed at the Quebec Summer Festival.

Their 2011 album, Karaoké King, showed a shift to a more electronic sound.

Discography
 Lovesong N2 (2004)
 Sur ton visage (2005)
 E.P. L’IntégraLLL (2007)
 Gatineau (2007)

References

External links
 Gatineau official website

Musical groups established in 2004
Musical groups from Montreal
Canadian hip hop groups